Sloane Citron (born 1956) is an American publisher based in Menlo Park, California.

Beginnings
Citron has loved magazines and magazine publishing since he was a youth. In second grade, he started his first publication entitled The Second Grade News, and in junior high school, he subscribed to Folio, a trade publication about the magazine business. "I must have been the youngest subscriber," he remembers. He attended Phillips Academy in Andover, Massachusetts, and was friends with Gary Lee, future director Peter Sellars, and acted in a performance with future television star Dana Delany. While there, he founded a humor magazine entitled Muse, a secondary school equivalent to the Harvard Lampoon; he graduated in 1974. He studied at Claremont McKenna and was heavily involved in journalism, and received an internship at Los Angeles magazine where he developed a strong appreciation for regional magazines. He graduated from Stanford Business School.

Career
In the 1980s, Citron was general manager of Miami magazine and South Florida Home & Garden. In 1985, he founded Westar Media in Redwood City, California. His first magazine Peninsula was an upscale monthly similar in format to New York Magazine which focused on the San Francisco suburbs in San Mateo and Santa Clara counties. He founded other magazines including Northern California Home & Garden and Southern California Home & Garden; the firm owned six magazines at one point. In the 1990s, he launched 18 Media with journalist and business partner Elsie Floriani.

Citron veered from the standard subscription model of magazine publishing, and pioneered what might be termed the "saturation delivery" model. 

Glossy high production magazines were sent free to every home in the highly affluent cities and towns of Silicon Valley. The new format meant that he could virtually eliminate the entire subscription department, and avoid the fuss of renewals and insert cards. His magazines Click Weekly and CAFE covered the lifestyles of people in Silicon Valley's high-tech industry. In 2018, he launched Punch magazine, a publication that showcases new ideas and culture from the San Francisco peninsula. While reading a Wikipedia article on defunct British magazines, he came upon the title 'Punch', and chose that after considering more than a thousand different possible titles, to convey a sense of being both modern and hip.

Personal life
Citron is married with four children in a traditional Jewish family and he has coached T-ball, basketball, and soccer.

References

External links
 18 Media website

Living people
American publishers (people)
Phillips Academy alumni
Claremont McKenna College alumni
Stanford Graduate School of Business alumni
People from Menlo Park, California
1956 births
Writers from the San Francisco Bay Area
Businesspeople from the San Francisco Bay Area